This list of universities in Peru includes officially recognized public and private universities in Peru, sorted by region. In 2015, enrollment was divided into 979,896 for private universities and 333,501 for public universities. The average number of years of schooling in Peru for students born after 1980 was 11.4 years in 2018, and 12.6 years for Lima, with expected years of schooling being 14.2 years overall.

They are regulated by the National Superintendence of Higher University Education (SUNEDU)

On May 12, is instituted as the "Day of Peruvian Universities", due to being the date of creation of the University of San Marcos, the oldest in the Americas.

Nationwide

Department of Lima 

Universidad Nacional Mayor de San Marcos (UNMSM), Dean University of the Americas (The University of Peru), the first university in Peru and in the Americas.
Universidad Nacional de Ingeniería (UNI)
Universidad Nacional Federico Villarreal (UNFV)
Universidad Nacional José Faustino Sánchez Carrión, Huacho (UNJFSC)
Universidad Nacional de Educación Enrique Guzmán y Valle, Chosica (UNE)
Universidad Nacional Tecnológica de Lima Sur  (UNTELS)
Universidad Peruana Cayetano Heredia (UPCH)
Universidad Nacional Agraria La Molina (UNALM)
Universidad de Lima (Private) (UL)
Universidad del Pacífico (UP)
Universidad Alas Peruanas (UAP)
Universidad Antonio Ruiz de Montoya (UARM)
Universidad Peruana de Ciencias Aplicadas (UPC)
Universidad Católica Sedes Sapientiae (UCSS)
Universidad Particular Marcelino Champagnat (UMCH)
Universidad César Vallejo (UCV)

Universidad Científica del Sur (UCSUR)
Universidad de Piura (UDEP), Lima
Universidad de San Martín de Porres (USMP)
Universidad Peruana Unión (UPEU)
Universidad Ricardo Palma (URP)
Universidad San Ignacio de Loyola (USIL)
Universidad ESAN (UE)
Universidad Femenina del Sagrado Corazón (UNIFE)
Universidad Inca Garcilaso de la Vega (UIGV)
Facultad de Teología Pontificia y Civil de Lima
Pontificia Universidad Católica del Perú-Lima
University of Sciences and Arts of Latin America (UCAL)
Universidad Peruana de Ciencias e Informática (UPCI)
Universidad Peruana de las Americas
Universidad Tecnológica del Perú (UTP)
TECH Technological University

Region of Callao 

Universidad Nacional del Callao, Bellavista, Callao
Escuela Nacional de Marina Mercante "Almirante Miguel Grau", Chucuito District, Callao

Northern regions 

National University of Trujillo, Trujillo
Universidad Nacional Toribio Rordríguez De Mendoza, Chachapoyas
Universidad Nacional Pedro Ruiz Gallo, Lambayeque
Universidad Nacional de Cajamarca, Cajamarca
Universidad Nacional de Jaen, Jaen
Universidad Nacional de la Amazonía Peruana, Iquitos
Universidad Nacional de San Martín
Universidad Nacional de Piura, Piura
Cesar Vallejo University, Trujillo
Private University of the North, Trujillo
Private University of Trujillo, Trujillo
Universidad de Piura (UDEP), Piura
Universidad Señor de Sipan, Lambayeque
Antenor Orrego Private University, Trujillo
Catholic University of Trujillo, Trujillo
Universidad Privada Antonio Guillermo Urrelo, Cajamarca
Universidad Católica Santo Toribio de Mogrovejo, Lambayeque
Universidad de Chiclayo, Chiclayo
Universidad Particular de Iquitos
Universidad de Lambayeque, Chiclayo
Universidad Privada Juan Mejía Baca, Chiclayo
Leonardo Da Vinci Private University, Trujillo
 Universidad San Pedro, Sullana

Central regions 

Universidad Nacional de Áncash Santiago Antúnez de Mayolo, Huaraz
Universidad Nacional del Centro del Perú (UNCP), Huancayo
Universidad Nacional Daniel Alcides Carrión, Cerro de Pasco
Universidad Nacional de Ucayali, Pucallpa
Universidad Continental de Ciencias e Ingeniería, Huancayo
Catholic University Los Angeles of Chimbote, Chimbote
Los Andes Peruvian University (UPLA), Huancayo

Department of Huánuco 

Universidad Nacional Hermilio Valdizán, Department of Huánuco, Huánuco
University of Huanuco, Department of Huánuco, Huánuco

Southern regions 

 Universidad Nacional San Cristóbal de Huamanga, Ayacucho
Universidad Nacional San Antonio Abad del Cusco, Cusco
Universidad Nacional de San Agustín, Arequipa
Universidad Tecnológica de los Andes, Abancay

 Universidad Católica de San Pablo, Arequipa
 Universidad Católica de Santa María, Arequipa

 Universidad Andina del Cusco, Cusco
 Universidad Peruana Austral de Cusco, Cusco

 Universidad Nacional de Huancavelica, Huancavelica
Universidad Nacional San Luis Gonzaga de Ica, Ica
Universidad Andina del Cusco, Puerto Maldonado

 Universidad Nacional San Antonio Abad del Cusco, Puerto Maldonado

 Universidad de Moquegua, Moquegua

 Universidad Andina Néstor Cáceres Velásquez, Juliaca
 Universidad Nacional del Altiplano, Puno
Universidad Nacional de San Agustín, (UNSA) Arequipa, SUNEDU

 Universidad Nacional Jorge Basadre Grohmann, Tacna
 Universidad Privada de Tacna, Tacna

References

External links 

 Universities in Peru by region

Universities
Peru
Peru